Rhaponticum heleniifolium is a perennial herbaceous flowering plant in the genus 'Rhaponticum of the family Asteraceae.

Description
The biological form of Rhaponticum heleniifolium is hemicryptophyte scapose, as its overwintering buds are situated just below the soil surface and the floral axis is more or less erect with a few leaves.

 Rhaponticum heleniifolium reaches on average  in height. The strong, thick, upright stem is quite leafy and hairy and usually has only one inflorescence. The leaves are green, while its underside is white-tomentose. Regarding the morphology of leaf blades, this species (as the similar Rhaponticum scariosum Lam.) is quite polymorphic. The basal leaves are usually lanceolate or elliptical and petiolated. The bracts are brownish and membranous. The flowering period extends from June to August. The flowers are hermaphroditic and are pollinated by insects. The fruits are brown achenes. Rhaponticum heleniifolium subsp. heleniifolium has scales with acute apex and the leaves are much more elongated.

Distribution
This quite rare plant occurs in Italy, France, Switzerland, and Austria.

Habitat
It grows in western Alps in sub-alpine and alpine meadows and stony slopes. This plant prefers calcareous soils, at altitudes from 750 to 2500 meters.

Synonyms
 Rhaponticum lyratum (DC.) Bergmans
 Leuzea rhapontica subsp. heleniifolia Holub
 Rhaponticum scariosum subsp. lyratum (DC.) Hayek
 Stemmacantha heleniifolia (Godr. & Gren.) Dittrich
 Rhaponticum scariosum subsp. heleniifolium (Godr. & Gren.) Nyman
 Stemmacantha rhapontica subsp. heleniifolia
 Stemmacantha heleniifolia subsp. heleniifolia
 Centaurea lyrata Bellardi
 Centaurea heleniifolia Fritsch

Gallery

References

 Josef Holub - Contribution to the taxonomy and nomenclature of Leuzea DC. and Rhaponticum auct - Folia Geobotanica - Vol. 1 / 1966 - Vol. 46 / 2011

External links

 Schede di Botanica

Cynareae
Flora of the Alps